Gry Bagøien, known as Gry, born in 1975 is a singer from Denmark.

Biography

Gry was born in Denmark in 1975. Until the age of 10 she was raised in Mozambique without seeing the western world.

Gry was a member of now-defunct Æter, along with Jacob Kirkegaard, a Dane living in Germany.

She was a singer in the band Gry, which is a collaboration with German industrial and electronic musician F. M. Einheit. The band was F. M. Einheit's main project after he left Einstürzende Neubauten, being a band member over 16 years. The band Gry released two full-length albums and disbanded as Gry Bagøien left the band in 2002.

Gry also created an opera "Idea" for Resonance FM in London.

In 2006 she was in a band "The Loverz", releasing one album called "Love".

Gry moved to Berlin around 2009 and founded her own label, Present Records. There she released a solo EP "Anima" in 2009.

Gry was studying the art of film at the Academy of Media Arts Cologne. She graduated with the sound art film called "Wiiiu Whit Grrr", in which she was singing and talking with animals.

Gry is featured on the 2012 album "Leland" by Francis Harris, released by the label Scissor and Thread.
A solo album is planned for release in 2014 on "Scissor And Thread" label.

Participations and Releases

Solo
 Gry – All Comes Remix EP – Orphanear 2010
 Gry – Anima – Present Records 2010 (EP, part one of Xdent trilogy)

With Æter
 Æter – Luftantænder – Helicopter Records 1997
 Æter – Improvisations – aeter.dk 2002 (download)
 Æter – Oxygin – Autoproduction 2005 (download)

With F.M. Einheit
 Gry – Touch Of E! – Rough Trade Records 1998
 Gry – Public Recording – FM 4.5.1 2000
 Ammer/Einheit – Frost 79° 40' – FM 4.5.1 Records 2000

Guest appearances and other contributions
 Skole ost (children's punk band)
 Robot – Robot – Helicopter Records 1999 (guest singer)
 Pigface – The Best of Pigface – Invisible Records 2001 (guest singer)
 The Loverz – Love – Noreal Original Records 2006
 Francis Harris – Leland – Scissor And Thread 2012
 Christian Löffler – Feelharmonia – A Forest 2012 (guest singer)
 Frank & Tony – You Go Girl – Bring the Sun – Scissor and Thread – 2014 (guest singer)

References

External links
 
 Present Records
 Gry Bagøien on SoundCloud

21st-century Danish women singers
Pigface members
Living people
1975 births